Nelson Platt Wheeler (November 4, 1841 – March 3, 1920) was a U.S. Representative from the state of Pennsylvania.

Nelson P. Wheeler was born in Portville, New York. His brother was William E. Wheeler. He attended the public schools and academies in Olean, and Deposit, New York. He became a surveyor and civil engineer. He moved to Endeavor, Pennsylvania, and was engaged in the lumber business and also interested in agricultural pursuits and banking. He was elected as county commissioner in 1866, and held various township offices.

Wheeler was member of the Pennsylvania State House of Representatives in 1878 and 1879. He was elected as a Republican to the Sixtieth and Sixty-first Congresses.  He was an unsuccessful candidate for renomination in 1910, but the primary election was contested and his opponent subsequently withdrew and he was tendered the congressional nomination, but declined. He resumed his former business pursuits in Endeavor. He moved to Pasadena, California, in 1915 due to poor health, and died there on March 3, 1920.  Interment in Mountain View Cemetery.

References

Sources

The Political Graveyard

1841 births
1920 deaths
Republican Party members of the Pennsylvania House of Representatives
People from Cattaraugus County, New York
People from Forest County, Pennsylvania
Republican Party members of the United States House of Representatives from Pennsylvania